The 1972 United States presidential election in Pennsylvania took place on November 7, 1972, and was part of the 1972 United States presidential election. Voters chose 27 representatives, or electors to the Electoral College, who voted for president and vice president.

Pennsylvania strongly voted for the Republican nominee, President Richard Nixon, over the Democratic nominee, Senator George McGovern. Nixon won Pennsylvania by a large margin of 19.98%, winning every county except for Philadelphia.  This result nonetheless was over 3% more Democratic than the nation at-large. , this is the last election in which Allegheny County voted Republican,  and the last time that county did not vote the same as Philadelphia. As of 2020, this marked the last time when the Republican presidential nominee carried the state by more than 10 percentage points and the most recent time when any presidential candidate won the state by over 15 points. This is the most recent election where Pennsylvania voted to the right of McGovern's home state of South Dakota. This was the only occasion between 1928 and 2008 that Fayette County and Washington County voted Republican.

Results

Results by county

See also
 List of United States presidential elections in Pennsylvania

Notes

References

Pennsylvania
1972
1972 Pennsylvania elections